The 2nd constituency of Calvados is a French legislative constituency in the Calvados department, covering the east of Caen, the department's prefecture. Like the other 576 French constituencies, it elects one MP using the two-round system, with a run-off if no candidate receives over 50% of the vote in the first round.

Deputies

Election results

2022

 
 
 
 
 
 
 
|-
| colspan="8" bgcolor="#E9E9E9"|
|-

2017

2012

|- style="background-color:#E9E9E9;text-align:center;"
! colspan="2" rowspan="2" style="text-align:left;" | Candidate
! rowspan="2" colspan="2" style="text-align:left;" | Party
! colspan="2" | 1st round
! colspan="2" | 2nd round
|- style="background-color:#E9E9E9;text-align:center;"
! width="75" | Votes
! width="30" | %
! width="75" | Votes
! width="30" | %
|-
| style="background-color:" |
| style="text-align:left;" | Laurence Dumont
| style="text-align:left;" | Socialist Party
| PS
| 
| 45.97%
| 
| 62.49%
|-
| style="background-color:" |
| style="text-align:left;" | Rodolphe Thomas
| style="text-align:left;" | Democratic Movement
| MoDem
| 
| 20.65%
| 
| 37.51%
|-
| style="background-color:" |
| style="text-align:left;" | Amandine Francois
| style="text-align:left;" | Union for a Popular Movement
| UMP
| 
| 11.98%
| colspan="2" style="text-align:left;" |
|-
| style="background-color:" |
| style="text-align:left;" | Christophe Mal
| style="text-align:left;" | Front National
| FN
| 
| 8.35%
| colspan="2" style="text-align:left;" |
|-
| style="background-color:" |
| style="text-align:left;" | Gérard Leneveu
| style="text-align:left;" | Left Front
| FG
| 
| 7.61%
| colspan="2" style="text-align:left;" |
|-
| style="background-color:" |
| style="text-align:left;" | Caroline Amiel
| style="text-align:left;" | Europe Ecology – The Greens
| EELV
| 
| 3.29%
| colspan="2" style="text-align:left;" |
|-
| style="background-color:" |
| style="text-align:left;" | Christophe Sady
| style="text-align:left;" | Ecologist
| ECO
| 
| 0.45%
| colspan="2" style="text-align:left;" |
|-
| style="background-color:" |
| style="text-align:left;" | Driss Anhichem
| style="text-align:left;" | Miscellaneous Left
| DVG
| 
| 0.44%
| colspan="2" style="text-align:left;" |
|-
| style="background-color:" |
| style="text-align:left;" | Florine Le Bris
| style="text-align:left;" | Far Left
| EXG
| 
| 0.43%
| colspan="2" style="text-align:left;" |
|-
| style="background-color:" |
| style="text-align:left;" | Christophe Garcia
| style="text-align:left;" | Far Left
| EXG
| 
| 0.34%
| colspan="2" style="text-align:left;" |
|-
| style="background-color:" |
| style="text-align:left;" | Jacqueline Tancelin-Goueslard
| style="text-align:left;" | Far Left
| EXG
| 
| 0.25%
| colspan="2" style="text-align:left;" |
|-
| style="background-color:" |
| style="text-align:left;" | Jean Paul Ducandas
| style="text-align:left;" | Far Left
| EXG
| 
| 0.18%
| colspan="2" style="text-align:left;" |
|-
| style="background-color:" |
| style="text-align:left;" | Eric Le Denmat
| style="text-align:left;" | 
| CEN
| 
| 0.07%
| colspan="2" style="text-align:left;" |
|-
| colspan="8" style="background-color:#E9E9E9;"|
|- style="font-weight:bold"
| colspan="4" style="text-align:left;" | Total
| 
| 100%
| 
| 100%
|-
| colspan="8" style="background-color:#E9E9E9;"|
|-
| colspan="4" style="text-align:left;" | Registered voters
| 
| style="background-color:#E9E9E9;"|
| 
| style="background-color:#E9E9E9;"|
|-
| colspan="4" style="text-align:left;" | Blank/Void ballots
| 
| 1.01%
| 
| 2.84%
|-
| colspan="4" style="text-align:left;" | Turnout
| 
| 58.41%
| 
| 56.15%
|-
| colspan="4" style="text-align:left;" | Abstentions
| 
| 41.59%
| 
| 43.85%
|-
| colspan="8" style="background-color:#E9E9E9;"|
|- style="font-weight:bold"
| colspan="6" style="text-align:left;" | Result
| colspan="2" style="background-color:" | PS HOLD
|}

2007

|- style="background-color:#E9E9E9;text-align:center;"
! colspan="2" rowspan="2" style="text-align:left;" | Candidate
! rowspan="2" colspan="2" style="text-align:left;" | Party
! colspan="2" | 1st round
! colspan="2" | 2nd round
|- style="background-color:#E9E9E9;text-align:center;"
! width="75" | Votes
! width="30" | %
! width="75" | Votes
! width="30" | %
|-
| style="background-color:" |
| style="text-align:left;" | Laurence Dumont
| style="text-align:left;" | Socialist Party
| PS
| 
| 37.68%
| 
| 54.62%
|-
| style="background-color:" |
| style="text-align:left;" | Rodolphe Thomas
| style="text-align:left;" | Democratic Movement
| MoDem
| 
| 37.94%
| 
| 45.38%
|-
| style="background-color:" |
| style="text-align:left;" | Alain Gruenais
| style="text-align:left;" | The Greens
| VEC
| 
| 4.73%
| colspan="2" style="text-align:left;" |
|-
| style="background-color:" |
| style="text-align:left;" | Gérard Leneveu
| style="text-align:left;" | Communist
| PCF
| 
| 4.60%
| colspan="2" style="text-align:left;" |
|-
| style="background-color:" |
| style="text-align:left;" | Henri Ferey
| style="text-align:left;" | Front National
| FN
| 
| 2.81%
| colspan="2" style="text-align:left;" |
|-
| style="background-color:" |
| style="text-align:left;" | Cynthia Colosio
| style="text-align:left;" | Far Left
| EXG
| 
| 2.48%
| colspan="2" style="text-align:left;" |
|-
| style="background-color:" |
| style="text-align:left;" | Bernard Crouzille
| style="text-align:left;" | Miscellaneous Right
| DVD
| 
| 2.22%
| colspan="2" style="text-align:left;" |
|-
| style="background-color:" |
| style="text-align:left;" | Sophie Noel
| style="text-align:left;" | Movement for France
| MPF
| 
| 1.84%
| colspan="2" style="text-align:left;" |
|-
| style="background-color:" |
| style="text-align:left;" | Hélène Kunkel
| style="text-align:left;" | Hunting, Fishing, Nature, Traditions
| CPNT
| 
| 1.73%
| colspan="2" style="text-align:left;" |
|-
| style="background-color:" |
| style="text-align:left;" | Christophe Sady
| style="text-align:left;" | Ecologist
| ECO
| 
| 1.00%
| colspan="2" style="text-align:left;" |
|-
| style="background-color:" |
| style="text-align:left;" | Eric Le Denmat
| style="text-align:left;" | Independent
| DIV
| 
| 0.95%
| colspan="2" style="text-align:left;" |
|-
| style="background-color:" |
| style="text-align:left;" | Christophe Garcia
| style="text-align:left;" | Far Left
| EXG
| 
| 0.93%
| colspan="2" style="text-align:left;" |
|-
| style="background-color:" |
| style="text-align:left;" | Rémi Aillaud
| style="text-align:left;" | Far Left
| EXG
| 
| 0.76%
| colspan="2" style="text-align:left;" |
|-
| style="background-color:" |
| style="text-align:left;" | Eric Delteil
| style="text-align:left;" | Far Left
| EXG
| 
| 0.34%
| colspan="2" style="text-align:left;" |
|-
| colspan="8" style="background-color:#E9E9E9;"|
|- style="font-weight:bold"
| colspan="4" style="text-align:left;" | Total
| 
| 100%
| 
| 100%
|-
| colspan="8" style="background-color:#E9E9E9;"|
|-
| colspan="4" style="text-align:left;" | Registered voters
| 
| style="background-color:#E9E9E9;"|
| 
| style="background-color:#E9E9E9;"|
|-
| colspan="4" style="text-align:left;" | Blank/Void ballots
| 
| 1.88%
| 
| 1.91%
|-
| colspan="4" style="text-align:left;" | Turnout
| 
| 58.94%
| 
| 61.97%
|-
| colspan="4" style="text-align:left;" | Abstentions
| 
| 41.06%
| 
| 38.03%
|-
| colspan="8" style="background-color:#E9E9E9;"|
|- style="font-weight:bold"
| colspan="6" style="text-align:left;" | Result
| colspan="2" style="background-color:" | PS GAIN FROM UDF
|}

2002

 
 
 
 
 
 
 
 
|-
| colspan="8" bgcolor="#E9E9E9"|
|-

1997

 
 
 
 
 
 
 
 
|-
| colspan="8" bgcolor="#E9E9E9"|
|-

References

Sources
 *
 

2